Justin Allen Pérez Aguilar (born February 9, 1992 in Eagle Pass, Texas) is a professional Mexican footballer who currently plays for C.F. Monterrey Premier.

References

C.F. Monterrey players
1992 births
Living people
Mexican footballers
Liga Nacional de Fútbol Profesional de Honduras players
C.D. Honduras Progreso players
Soccer players from Texas
People from Eagle Pass, Texas
Association football goalkeepers